Prise de parole ("Speaking Out") is a Canadian book publishing company. Located in Greater Sudbury, Ontario, Canada, the company publishes French language literature, primarily but not exclusively by Franco-Ontarian authors.

History
The company was established in the early 1970s by the Coopérative des artistes du Nouvel-Ontario, a group of professors and students at Laurentian University who established nearly all of the city's contemporary francophone cultural institutions. Its first book, released in 1973, was Lignes Signes, an anthology of poetry by Jean Lalonde, Placide Gaboury, Denis St-Jules and Gaston Tremblay, while its first fiction title was Hermaphrodismes, two erotic novellas written by Fernand Dorais under the pen name "Tristan Lafleur".

The most successful title in the company's history is Doric Germain's novel La vengeance de l'orignal. In 1996, the firm was involved in the Federal Court of Canada case Prise de parole Inc v Guérin, éditeur Ltée, after another publishing company published unauthorized excerpts from La vengeance de l'orignal in an anthology for use in schools. The case, which awarded Germain $10,000 in compensation but found that Guérin's actions were not an infringement on Germain's moral rights as the excerpts were not damaging to his reputation, is now considered a key precedent in the matter of moral rights in Canadian copyright law,

Other writers published by the company have included Herménégilde Chiasson, Jean-Marc Dalpé, Alain Doom, Fernand Ouellet, Daniel Poliquin, Patrice Desbiens, Michel Bock, Marguerite Andersen, Robert Marinier, Melchior Mbonimpa, Jocelyne Villeneuve, Maurice Henrie, Hélène Brodeur, Franco Catanzariti, Estelle Beauchamp and Robert Dickson, as well as French translations of English works by Charlie Angus, Phil Hall, Matthew Heiti and Tomson Highway.

The company's offices moved in 2022 to the new Place des Arts facility in downtown Sudbury.

Awards
As of 2018, titles published by the company have won the Governor General's Award for French-language drama twice, for Dalpé's Le Chien in 1989 and Il n'y a que l'amour in 1999, the Governor General's Award for French-language poetry twice, for Chiasson's Conversations in 1999 and Dickson's Humains paysages en temps de paix relative in 2002, and the Governor General's Award for French-language fiction once, for Dalpé's Un vent se lève qui éparpille in 2000.

References

Book publishing companies of Canada
Culture of Greater Sudbury
Franco-Ontarian organizations
Companies based in Greater Sudbury
1973 establishments in Ontario
Publishing companies established in 1973